Westbrook High School may refer to:

Westbrook High School (Connecticut), in Westbrook, Connecticut
Westbrook High School (Maine), in Westbrook, Maine
Westbrook-Walnut Grove Senior School, in Westbrook, Minnesota, part of Westbrook-Walnut Grove Schools
Westbrook High School (Texas), in Westbrook, Texas
West Brook Senior High School, in Beaumont, Texas